Antti Samuli Kaikkonen (born 14 February 1974 in Turku, Finland) is a Finnish politician of the Centre party. He has been a member of the Finnish Parliament from Uusimaa since 2003. Kaikkonen was the president of  Finnish Centre Youth from 1997 to 2001. He has also been a member of Finnish Delegation to the  Council of Europe since 2004.

In 2013, Kaikkonen was convicted of corruption charges stemming from a campaign financing scandal.

On 21 June 2016, Kaikkonen was chosen as the chairman of the Centre Party's parliamentary group.

By 2019, Kaikkonen was parliamentary head of the coalition-leading Centre Party.  Amidst the Oulu child sexual exploitation scandal, he called for all party heads in Parliament to meet, and declared “everyone who comes to Finland has to follow the local laws.”

Campaign finance scandal

In the autumn of 2009, Kaikkonen received his share of the campaign finance. At that time, it was brought to public, that the Youth Foundation, of which Kaikkonen had been the chairman of the board since 2003, had distributed election support money to Kaikkonen, in municipal-, parliamentary-, and European Parliament -elections. In addition, it had also financed Matti Vanhanen's presidential election campaign, among other things. Kaikkonen resigned from the chairman's place, and then stayed as a member of the board.

The prosecutor demanded Kaikkonen's imprisonment in the Youth Foundation bribery trial, that began on 16 January 2012. In January 2013 the Helsinki District Court sentenced Kaikkonen to five months in conditional discharge for abuse of trust. He did not appeal his verdict.

Personal life
Kaikkonen has two children; Kaikkonen announced that he would take parental leave in early 2023.

Honours
: Commander Grand Cross of the Royal Order of the Polar Star (17 May 2022)

References

1974 births
Living people
People from Turku
Centre Party (Finland) politicians
Ministers of Defence of Finland
Members of the Parliament of Finland (2003–07)
Members of the Parliament of Finland (2007–11)
Members of the Parliament of Finland (2011–15)
Members of the Parliament of Finland (2015–19)
Members of the Parliament of Finland (2019–23)